Aleksandr Vladimirovich Tsilyurik (born 1 March 1965) is a former Russian professional footballer.

Club career
He made his professional debut in the Soviet Second League in 1982 for SKA Odessa.

Personal life
His son, also called Aleksandr Tsilyurik, played football professionally as well.

References

1965 births
People from Kremenchuk
Living people
Soviet footballers
Russian footballers
Association football forwards
SKA Odesa players
FC Olympik Kharkiv players
FC Okean Kerch players
FC Kuban Krasnodar players
FC Lokomotiv Nizhny Novgorod players
FC Ural Yekaterinburg players
FC Baltika Kaliningrad players
PFC Krylia Sovetov Samara players
FC Mordovia Saransk players
Russian Premier League players
Russian football managers